County Road 13 or County Route 13 may refer to:

 County Road 13 (Flagler County, Florida)
 County Road 13 (Orange County, Florida)
 County Road 13 (St. Johns County, Florida)
 County Road 13 (Goodhue County, Minnesota)
 County Road 13 (Hennepin County, Minnesota)
 County Road 13 (St. Louis County, Minnesota)
 County Road 13 (Washington County, Minnesota)
 County Route 13 (Monmouth County, New Jersey)
 County Route 13 (Allegany County, New York)
 County Route 13 (Chemung County, New York)
 County Route 13 (Chenango County, New York)
 County Route 13 (Columbia County, New York)
 County Route 13 (Dutchess County, New York)
 County Route 13 (Franklin County, New York)
 County Route 13 (Genesee County, New York)
 County Route 13 (Greene County, New York)
 County Route 13 (Herkimer County, New York)
 County Route 13 (Jefferson County, New York)
 County Route 13 (Lewis County, New York)
 County Route 13 (Niagara County, New York)
 County Route 13 (Oneida County, New York)
 County Route 13 (Onondaga County, New York)
 County Route 13 (Putnam County, New York)
 County Route 13 (Rockland County, New York)
 County Route 13 (Schoharie County, New York)
 County Route 13 (Schuyler County, New York)
 County Route 13 (Steuben County, New York)
 County Route 13 (Suffolk County, New York)
 County Route 13 (Sullivan County, New York)
 County Route 13 (Ulster County, New York)